Kellerton is a city in eastern Ringgold County, Iowa, United States. The population was 243 at the time of the 2020 census.

Geography
Kellerton is located on Iowa Highway 2 approximately nine miles west of Mount Ayr and two miles west of the Ringgold-Decatur county line.

Demographics

2010 census
As of the census of 2010, there were 315 people, 126 households, and 88 families living in the city. The racial makeup of the city was 96.2% White, 1.0% Native American, 1.6% from other races, and 1.3% from two or more races. Hispanic or Latino of any race were 2.2% of the population.

There were 126 households, of which 34.9% had children under the age of 18 living with them, 48.4% were married couples living together, 15.1% had a female householder with no husband present, 6.3% had a male householder with no wife present, and 30.2% were non-families. 22.2% of all households were made up of individuals, and 11.9% had someone living alone who was 65 years of age or older. The average household size was 2.50 and the average family size was 2.91.

The median age in the city was 37.3 years. 27.3% of residents were under the age of 18; 7.1% were between the ages of 18 and 24; 25.7% were from 25 to 44; 22.9% were from 45 to 64; and 17.1% were 65 years of age or older. The gender makeup of the city was 52.7% male and 47.3% female.

2000 census
As of the census of 2000, there were 372 people, 152 households, and 96 families living in the city. The racial makeup of the city was 98.92% White, 0.54% Native American, and 0.54% from two or more races.

There were 152 households, out of which 33.6% had children under the age of 18 living with them, 48.0% were married couples living together, 10.5% had a female householder with no husband present, and 36.2% were non-families. 30.9% of all households were made up of individuals, and 20.4% had someone living alone who was 65 years of age or older. The average household size was 2.45 and the average family size was 3.07.

In the city, the population was spread out, with 30.6% under the age of 18, 8.3% from 18 to 24, 24.7% from 25 to 44, 19.1% from 45 to 64, and 17.2% who were 65 years of age or older. The median age was 36 years. For every 100 females, there were 88.8 males. For every 100 females age 18 and over, there were 87.0 males.

The median income for a household in the city was $29,000, and the median income for a family was $33,173. Males had a median income of $19,844 versus $18,929 for females. The per capita income for the city was $11,442. About 14.9% of families and 20.6% of the population were below the poverty line, including 27.0% of those under age 18 and 29.3% of those age 65 or over.

Education
Mount Ayr Community School District operates public schools serving the community.

Notable person

 Duane Miller (born 1947), professional football player and Drake University football record-holder.

References

Cities in Iowa
Cities in Ringgold County, Iowa